DXUE (103.5 FM), broadcasting as Halo Halo 103.5, is a radio station owned and operated by Viva Live, Inc., a subsidiary of Viva Entertainment. Its studio and transmitter are located at Room 404, BGIDC Bldg., Nuñez St. cor. Tomas Claudio St., Zamboanga City.

Profile
The station began operations in 1996 as Ultimate Radio 103.5 UE, carrying a CHR/Top 40 format with the slogan The Spirit of Zamboanga.

In 2013, Viva Live, Inc. acquired the franchises of Ultimate Entertainment Inc. In October 2014, the station went back on air as Oomph Radio, carrying a CHR/Top 40 format. In June 2016, the station rebranded back to 103.5 UE and added 70s, 80s and 90s to its playlist, despite retaining its format. However, the following month, Oomph Radio returned. In February 2017, the Oomph Radio brand was retired once again due to management decision.

In May 2017, the station was relaunched as Halo Halo, the first and only FM station in each city playing only Original Pilipino Music.

Halo Halo Stations

References

Radio stations in Zamboanga City
Viva Entertainment
Radio stations established in 1996